Eleko Beach is a private beach in the Lekki Peninsula, about 30 miles east of the Lagos Island in Nigeria. It opened in 1989.

References

Beaches of Lagos
1989 establishments in Nigeria